Nergal (Sumerian:  dKIŠ.UNU or ; ; Aramaic: ܢܸܪܓܲܠ) was a Mesopotamian god worshiped through all periods of Mesopotamian history, from Early Dynastic to Neo-Babylonian times, with a few attestations under indicating his cult survived into the period of Achaemenid domination. He was primarily associated with war, death, and disease, and has been described as the "god of inflicted death". He reigned over Kur, the Mesopotamian underworld, depending on the myth either on behalf of his parents Enlil and Ninlil, or in later periods as a result of his marriage with the goddess Ereshkigal. Originally either Mammitum, a goddess possibly connected to frost, or Laṣ, sometimes assumed to be a minor medicine goddess, were regarded as his wife, though other traditions existed, too.

His primary cult center was Kutha, located in northern Mesopotamia. His main temple was the E-Meslam and he was also known by the name Meslamtaea, "he who comes out of Meslam". Initially he was only worshiped in the north, with a notable exception being Girsu during the reign of Gudea of Lagash, but starting with the Ur III period he became a major deity in the south too. He remained prominent in both Babylonia and Assyria in later periods, and in the Neo-Babylonian state pantheon he was regarded as the third most important god, after Marduk and Nabu.

Nergal was associated with a large number of local or foreign deities. The Akkadian god Erra was syncretised with him at an early date, and especially in literary texts they functioned as synonyms of each other. Other major deities frequently compared to or syncretised with him include the Western Semitic god Resheph, who was also a god of war, plague and death, and Elamite Simut, who was likely a warrior god and shared Nergal's association with the planet Mars. It has also been proposed that his name was used to represent a Hurrian god, possibly Kumarbi or Aštabi, in early inscriptions from Urkesh, but there is also evidence that he was worshiped by the Hurrians under his own name as one of the Mesopotamian deities they incorporated into their own pantheon.

Two well known myths focus on Nergal, Nergal and Ereshkigal and Epic of Erra. The former describes the circumstances of his marriage of Ereshkigal, the Mesopotamian goddess of the dead, while the latter describes his rampages and efforts of his sukkal (attendant deity) Ishum to stop them. He also appears in a number of other, less well preserved compositions.

Name
The conventional writing of Nergal's name changed through history. In the earliest sources, it was written as dKIŠ.UNU, as attested in texts from Shuruppak, Abu Salabikh, Adab and Ebla from the third millennium BCE. The sign GAL was added in the Akkadian period, while in the Old Babylonian period the signs KIŠ and GIR have coalesced, and both were used in writing of Nergal's name. They started to be differentiated again in the Middle Babylonian and Middle Assyrian periods, at which point GIR became the one used in Nergal's name. Two spellings common from the Middle Babylonian periods onward were dGIR-eri-gal and the logographic writing dU.GUR, in origin the name of a god regarded as Nergal's sukkal. Various alternate spellings are also attested, especially from locations such as Mari and Nuzi. In alphabetic scripts, such as Aramaic, the name was rendered as Nrgl.

The name can most likely be etymologized as "lord of the big city", a euphemistic way to refer to the god as a ruler of the world of the dead.

Before the reign of Shulgi, the name Nergal was rarely used in southern cities, where the god was instead called Meslamtaea, "he who comes out of Meslam". This name could also designate a distinct god, however, who formed a pair with Lugal-irra. It has been proposed that this was due to the fact that Nergal initially could not be recognized as a god of death in the south due to the existence of Ninazu (sometimes assumed to be the earliest Mesopotamian god of death) and Ereshkigal, and perhaps only served as a war deity. It appears that in Shuruppak, Nergal and Ninazu were already regarded as similar in the third millennium BCE.

From Old Babylonian period onward the name Erra could be applied to Nergal, though it originally referred to a distinct god. It is derived from the Semitic root HRR, and was etymologically related to the Akkadian verb ereru, "to scorch".

Nergal also had a large number of other names and epithets, according to Frans Wiggermann comparable only to a handful of other very popular deities (especially Inanna), with around 50 known from the Old Babylonian period, and about twice as many from the later god list An = Anum. Most  of them were compounds with the word lugal, "lord".

Functions and attributes
Nergal's role as a god of the underworld is already attested in an Early Dynastic zami hymn dedicated to Kutha, where he is additionally associated with the so-called "Enki-Ninki deities", a group regarded as ancestors of Enlil, who were believed to reside in the underworld. According to a hymn from the reign of Ishme-Dagan, dominion over the land of the dead was bestowed upon Nergal by his parents, Enlil and Ninlil. He was believed to decide fates of the dead the same way as Enlil did for the living. In one Old Babylonian adab song Nergal is described as "Enlil of the kalam (homeland) and kur (the underworld)". He was also occasionally referred to as Enlil-banda, "junior Enlil", usually an epithet of the god Enki.

In addition to being a god of the underworld, Nergal was also a war god, believed to accompany rulers on campaigns, but also to guarantee peace due to his fearsome nature serving as a deterrent. In that capacity he was known as Lugal-silimma, "lord of peace".  He was also associated with disease. As summed up by Frans Wiggermann, his various domains make him the god of "inflicted death".

He played an important role in apotropaic rituals, in which he was commonly invoked to protect houses from evil. Additionally, fragments of tablets containing the Epic of Erra, a text detailing his exploits, were used as amulets.

A few of Nergal's titles point at occasional association with vegetation and agriculture, namely Lugal-asal, "lord (of the) poplar"; Lugal-gišimmar, "Lord (of the) date palm" (also a title of Ninurta); Lugal-šinig, "Lord (of the) tamarisk"; Lugal-zulumma, "Lord (of the) dates".

Astral role
Nergal was associated with Mars, a planet like him associated with disease (especially kidney disease) in Mesopotamian beliefs. However, Mars was also associated with other deities: Ninazu (under the name "the Elam star"), Nintinugga, and especially Simut, in origin an Elamite god, whose name in Mesopotamian sources could simply refer to the planet (mulSi-mu-ut, "the star Simut").

A number of scholars in the early 20th century, for example Emil Kraeling, assumed that Nergal was in part a solar deity, and as such was sometimes identified with Shamash. Kraeling argued that Nergal was representative of a certain phase of the sun, specifically the sun of noontime and of the summer solstice that brings destruction, high summer being the dead season in the Mesopotamian annual cycle. This view is no longer present in modern scholarship. While some authors, for example Nikita Artemov, refer to Nergal as a deity of "quasi-solar" character,  primary sources show a connection between him and sunset rather than noon.  For instance, an Old Babylonian adab song contains a description of Nergal serving as a judge at sunset, while another composition calls him the "king of sunset". This association is also present in rituals meant to compel ghosts to return to the underworld through the gates to sunset.

Iconography

Nergal's role as a war god was exemplified by some of his attributes: mace, dagger and bow. A mace with three lion-shaped heads and a scimitar adorned with leonine decorations often appear as Nergal's weapons on cylinder seals. He was also often depicted in a type of flat cap commonly, but not exclusively, worn by underworld deities in Mesopotamian glyptic art.

Bulls and lions were associated with Nergal. On the basis of this connection it has been proposed that minor deities with bull-like ears on Old Babylonian terracotta plaques and cylinder seals might have been depictions of unspecified members of Nergal's entourage.

War standards could serve as a symbolic representation of Nergal too, and the Assyrians armies in particular were often accompanied by such devotional objects during campaigns. A similar symbol also represented Nergal on kudurru, inscribed boundary stones.

Associations with other deities
The god most closely associated with Nergal was Erra, whose name was Akkadian rather than Sumerian and can be understood as "scorching". Despite his origin, he is absent from the insicriptions of  the kings of the Akkadian Empire. The two of them started to be associated in the Old Babylonian period, were equated in the Weidner and An = Anum god lists, and appear to be synonyms of each other in literary texts (including the Epic of Erra and Nergal and Ereshkigal), where both names can occur side by side as designations of the same figure. However, while in other similar cases (Inanna and Ishtar, Enki and Ea) the Akkadian name eventually started to predominate over Sumerian, Erra was the less commonly used one. There are also examples of late bilingual texts using Nergal's name in the Akkadian version and Erra's in the Sumerian translation, indicating it was viewed as antiquated and was not in common use.

Two gods with names similar to Erra who were also associated with Nergal were Errakal and Erragal. It is assumed that they had a distinct origin from Erra.

Ninazu was seemingly already associated with Nergal in the Early Dynastic period, as a document from Shuruppak refers to him as "Nergal of Enegi", Enegi being Ninazu's main cult center. The city itself was sometimes called "Kutha of Sumer". In later times, especially in Eshnunna, he started to be viewed as a son of Enlil and Ninlil and a warrior god, similar to Nergal.

Many minor gods were associated or equated with Nergal. The god Shulmanu, known exclusively from Assyria, was associated with Nergal and even equated with him in god lists. Lagamar (Akkadian: "no mercy"), son of Urash (the male tutelary god of Dilbat) known both from Mesopotamian sources and from Mari and Susa is glossed as "Nergal" in the god list An = Anum. Lagamar, Shubula and a number of other deities are also equated with Nergal in the Weidner god list. Emu, a god from Suhum located on the Euphrates near Mari, was regarded as Nergal-like. Luhusha (Sumerian: "angry man"), worshiped in Kish, was referred to as "Nergal of Kish".

As a judge deity, Nergal was on occasion associated with Ishtaran. However, as noted by Jeremiah Peterson, this association is unusual as Nergal was believed to act as a judge in locations where the sun sets in mythological texts, while on the account of Der’s location Ishtaran was usually associated with the east, where the sun rises.

Parents and siblings
Enlil and Ninlil are attested as Nergal's parents in the overwhelming majority of sources. While in the myth Nergal and Ereshkigal he addresses Ea as "father", this might merely be a honorific, as no other evidence for such an association exists.

In the myth Enlil and Ninlil Nergal's brothers are Ninazu (usually instead a brother of Ninmada), Nanna and Enbilulu. In a single text, a Neo-Babylonian letter from Marad, his brothers are instead Nabu and Lugal-Marada, the tutelary god of this city. However, this reference is most likely an example of captatio benevolentiae, a rhetorical device meant to secure the goodwill of the reader, rather than a statement about genealogy of deities.

Wives and children
Multiple goddesses are attested as Nergal's wife in various time periods and locations, but most of them are poorly defined in known documents. While Frans Wiggermann assumes that all of them were understood as goddesses connected to the earth, this assumption is not shared by other assyriologists.

Laṣ, first attested in an offering list from the Ur III period mentioning various deities from Kutha, was the goddess most commonly regarded as Nergal's spouse, especially from the Kassite and middle Assyrian periods onward. She received offerings from neo-Babylonian kings alongside Nergal in Kutha. Her name is assumed to have its origin in a Semitic language, but both its meaning and Laṣ' character are unknown. Based on the Weidner god list, Wilfred G. Lambert proposes that she was a medicine goddess. Couples consisting of a warrior god and a medicine goddess (such as Pabilsag and Ninisina or Zababa and Bau) were common in Mesopotamian mythology.

Another goddess often viewed as the wife of Nergal was Mammitum. Her name is homophonous with Mami, a goddess of birth known for example from the Nippur god list, leading some researchers to conflate them. However, it is generally accepted that they were separate deities, and they are kept apart in Mesopotamian god lists. Multiple meanings have been proposed for her name, including "oath" and "frost" (based on a similar Akkadian word, mammû, meaning "ice" or "frost"). It is possible she was introduced in Kutha alongside Erra. In at least one text, a description of a New Year ritual from Babylon during which the gods of Kish, Kutha and Borsippa were believed to visit Marduk (at the time not yet a major god), both she and Laṣ appear side by side as two separate goddesses. In the Nippur god list Laṣ occurs separately from Nergal, while Mammitum is present right behind him, which along with receiving offerings alongside him in Ekur in the same city in the Old Babylonian lead researches to conclude a spousal relation existed between them. She is also the wife of Erra/Nergal in the Epic of Erra. The Middle Babylonian god list An = Anum mentions both Laṣ and Mamitum, equating them with each other, and additionally calls the goddess Admu ("earth") Nergal's wife. She is otherwise only known from personal names and a single offering list from Old Babylonian Mari.

In third millennium BCE in Girsu, the spouse of Nergal (Meslamtaea) was Inanna's sukkal Ninshubur, otherwise seemingly viewed as unmarried. Attestations of Ninshubur as Nergal's sukkal are also known, though they are infrequent.

According to the myth Nergal and Ereshkigal he was married to Ereshkigal, the goddess of the dead. In god lists, however, they do not appear as husband and wife, though there is evidence that their entourages started to be combined as early as in the Ur III period. Ereshkigal's importance in Mesopotamia was largely limited to literary, rather than cultic, texts.

Nergal's daughter was Tadmushtum, a minor underworld goddess first attested in Drehem in the Ur III period. In an offering list she appears alongside Laṣ. Her name has Akkadian origin, possibly being derived from the words dāmasu ("to humble") or dāmašu (connected to the word "hidden"), though more distant cognates were also proposed, including Geʽez damasu ("to abolish", "to destroy", or alternatively "to hide"). It has also been proposed that a linguistic connection existed between her and the Ugaritic goddess Tadmish (or Dadmish, ddmš in the alphabetic script), who in some of the Ugaritic texts occurs alongside Resheph. A copy of the Weidner god list from Ugarit however equates Tadmish with Suzianna rather than Tadmushtum.

In neo-Babylonian lists of so-called "Divine Daughters", pairs of minor goddesses associated with specific temples likely viewed as daughters of their head gods, the "Daughters of E-Meslam" from Kutha are Dadamushda (Tadmushtum) and Belet-Ili.

While Frans Wiggermann and Piotr Michalowski additionally regard the god Shubula as Nergal's son, it is actually difficult to determine if such a relation existed between these two deities due to the poor preservation of the tablet of the god list An = Anum where Shubula's position in the pantheon was specified. Shubula might have been a son of Ishum rather than Nergal. He was an underworld god and is mostly known from personal names from the Ur III and Isin-Larsa periods. His name is most likely derived from the Akkadian word abālu ("dry"). There is also clear evidence that he was regarded as Tadmushtum's husband.

Sukkals and other servant deities
Nergal's sukkal (attendant deity) was initially the god Ugur (possibly the imperative form of Akkadian nāqaru, meaning "destroy!"), according to a theory developed by Wilfred G. Lambert the personification of his sword. After the Old Babylonian period he was replaced in this role by Ishum. Sporadically Inanna's sukkal Ninshubur or Ereshkigal's sukkal Namtar were said to fulfill this role in the court of Nergal instead.

His other courtiers included umum, so-called "day demons", who possibly represented points in time regarded as inauspicious; various minor deities associated with diseases; the minor warrior gods known as Sebitti; and a number of figures at times associated with Ereshkigal and gods such as Ninazu and Ningishzida as well, for example Namtar's wife Hushbisha, their daughter Hedimmeku, and the deified heroes Gilgamesh and Etana (understood as judges of the dead in this context). In some texts the connection between Gilgamesh in his underworld role and Nergal seems to be particularly close, with the hero being referred to as "Nergal's little brother".

Foreign deities

Resheph, the Western Semitic god of war and plague, was already associated with Nergal in Ebla in the third millennium BCE, though the connection was not exclusive, as he also occurs in contexts which seem to indicate a relation with Ea (known in Ebla as Hayya) instead. Furthermore, the Eblaite scribes never used Nergal's name as a logographic representation of Resheph's. According to Alfonso Archi, it is difficult to further speculate about the nature of Resheph and his relation to other deities in Eblaite religion due to lack of information about his individual characteristics. The equivalence between Nergal and the same western gods is also known from Ugarit, where Resheph was additionally associated with the planet Mars, much like Nergal in Mesopotamia. Documents from Emar on the Euphrates mention a god called "Nergal of the KI.LAM" (seemingly a term designating a market), commonly identified with Resheph by researchers. Additionally, "Lugal-Rasap" functioned as a title of Nergal in Mesopotamia according to god lists.

It has been proposed that in Urkesh, a Hurrian city in northern Syria, Nergal's name was used to represent a local deity of Hurrian origin logographically. Two possible explanations have been proposed: Aštabi and Kumarbi. The former was a god of Eblaite origin, later associated with Ninurta rather than Nergal, while the latter was the Hurrian "father of the gods", usually associated with Enlil and Dagan. Gernot Wilhelm concludes in a recent publication that the identification of Nergal in the early Urkesh inscriptions as Kumarbi is not implausible, but at the same remains impossible to conclusively prove. He points out that it is also not impossible that Kumarbi only developed as a distinct deity at a later point in time. Alfonso Archi notes that it also possible the god meant is Nergal himself, as he is attested in other Hurrian sources as an actively worshiped deity.

In the Yazılıkaya sanctuary, Nergal's name was apparently applied to a so-called "sword god", most likely a presently unidentified local god of death.

The Elamite god Simut was frequently associated with Nergal, shared his association with the planet Mars and possibly his warlike character, though unlike his Mesopotamian counterpart he was not an underworld deity. In one case he appears alongside Laṣ. Wouter Henkelman additionally proposes that "Nergal of Hubshal (or Hubshan)" known from Assyrian sources was Simut. However, other identities of the deity identified by this moniker have been proposed as well, with Volkert Haas instead identifying him as Ugur.

Based on lexical lists, two Kassite gods were identified with Nergal: Shugab and Dur.

In a Middle Assyrian god list, "Kammush" appears among the epithets of Nergal. According to Wilfred G. Lambert it cannot be established whether this indicates an equation with either the third millennium BCE god Kamish known from the Ebla texts, or the Iron Age god Chemosh from Moab.

In late, Hellenistic sources from Palmyra, Hatra and Tarsus Heracles served as the interpretatio graeca of Nergal. Heracles and Nergal were also both (at different points in time) associated with the Anatolian god Sandas.

Worship

Nergal's main cult center was Kutha, where his temple E-Meslam was located. Andrew R. George proposes the translation "house, warrior of the netherworld" for its name. A secondary name of the E-Meslam was E-ḫuškia, "fearsome house of the underworld". It is already attested in documents from the reign of Shulgi, don whose orders repair work was undertaken there. Later monarchs who also rebuilt it include Apil-Sin, Hammurabi, Ashurbanipal and Nebuchadnezzar II. It continued to function as late as in the Seleucid period. In addition to Kutha, Apak (Apiak) is well attested as a major cult center of Nergal, already attested in documents from the Sargonic period. Its precise location is not known, but it has been established that it was to the west of Marad. In this city, he could be referred to as Lugal-Apiak. While absent from Assyria in the Akkadian period, later he rose to the status of one of the most major gods there. Tarbishu was a particularly important Assyrian cult center of both Nergal and his wife Laṣ. His temple in this city, originally built by Sennacherib, also bore the name E-Meslam. A third temple named E-Meslam was located in Mashkan-shapir according to documents from the reign of Hammurabi, and it is possible it was dedicated to Nergal too. He is well attested in association with this city. 

Naram-Sin of Akkad was particularly devoted to Nergal, describing him as his "caretaker" (rābisu) and himself as a  "comrade" (rū'um) of the god. At the same time, worship of Nergal in the southernmost cities of Mesopotamia was uncommon in the third millennium BCE, one exception being the presence of "Meslamtaea" in Lagash in Gudea's times. This changed during the reign of Shulgi, the second king from the Third Dynasty of Ur. Theological texts from this period indicate that Nergal was viewed as one of the major gods and as king of the underworld. Tonia Sharlach proposes that "Nergal of TIN.TIRki" known from this period should be understood as the original tutelary god of Babylon. This interpretation is not supported by Andrew R. George, who notes that Nergal of TIN.TIRki is usually mentioned alongside Geshtinanna of KI.ANki, Ninhursag of KA.AM.RIki, and other deities worshiped in settlements located in the proximity of Umma. On this basis he argues that this place name should be read as Tintir and refers to a small town administered directly from Umma, and not to Babylon, whose name could be written as TIN.TIRki in later periods. He additionally points out that there is no indication that Babylon was regarded as a major cult center of Nergal in any time period. Other authors agree that the worship of Nergal is well attested in the area around Umma. 

In the Old Babylonian period Nergal continued to be worshiped as a god of the dead, as indicated for example by an elegy in which he appears alongside Ningishzida, Etana and Bidu, the gatekeeper of the underworld. Nergal also appears for the first time in documents from Uruk in this period. Anam of Uruk built a temple dedicated to him in nearby Uzurpara during the reign of Sîn-gāmil. It is possible that it bore the name E-dimgalanna, "house, great bond of heaven". Multiple temples of other deities (Sud, Aya and Nanna) bearing the same name are attested from other locations as well. Damiq-ilishu of Isin also built a temple of Nergal in this location, the E-kitušbidu, "house whose abode is pleasant". In Uruk itself, Nergal had a small sanctuary, possibly known as E-meteirra, "house worthy of the mighty one". A temple bearing this name was rebuilt by Kudur-Mabuk at one point. Nergal continued to be worshiped in Uruk as late as in early Achaemenid times. He is still mentioned in a source from the 29th year of the reign of Darius I. One late document mentions an oath taken in the presence of a priest (sanga) of Nergal during the sale of a prebend in which Nergal and Ereshkigal were invoked as divine witnesses.

A temple of Nergal bearing the name E-šahulla, "house of the happy heart", is mentioned in ancient temple lists, and was located in Mê-Turan. It shared its name with a temple of Nanaya located in Kazallu. According to Andrew R. George, its name was most likely a reference to the occasional association between Nergal and joy. For example, a street named "the thoroughfare of Nergal of Joy" (Akkadian: mūtaq Nergal ša ḫadê) existed in Babylon, while one god list mentions "Nergal of jubilation" (dU.GUR ša rišati).

In Lagaba, Nergal was worshiped under the name Išar-kidiššu. He could also be referred to as the god of Marad, though this city was chiefly associated with Lugal-Marada. Offerings or other forms of worship are also attested from Dilbat, Isin, Larsa, Nippur and Ur. It is possible that a temple of Nergal bearing the name E-erimḫašḫaš, "house which smites the wicked", which was at one point rebuilt by Rim-Sîn I, was located in the last of these cities. Temples dedicated to him also existed in both Isin and Nippur, but their names are not known. 

In the Neo-Babylonian period Nergal was regarded as the third most important god after Marduk and Nabu. These three gods often appear together in royal inscriptions. Based on a cylinder of Neriglissar providing for E-Meslam in Kutha was regarded as a royal duty, similar as in the case of Marduk's and Nabu's main temples (respectively E-Sagil in Babylon and E-Zida in Borsippa). However, administrative documents indicate that Nergal and his wife Laṣ received fewer offerings than Marduk or Nabu. In some families it was seemingly customary to give the third son a theophoric name invoking Nergal, in accordance with his position in the state pantheon.

14th and 28th days of the month were regarded as sacred to Nergal, as was the number 14 itself, though it was also associated with Sakkan.

Unlike some other deities with underworld associations, for example Ereshkigal, Nergal is attested in theophoric names.

Hurrian reception

Nergal was also incorporated into the pantheon of the Hurrians, and it has been argued he was among the earliest foreign gods they have adopted. He is one of the gods considered to be pan-Hurrian by modern researchers, a category also encompassing the likes of Teshub, Shaushka or Nupatik. He is already attested in the inscriptions of two early Hurrian kings of Urkesh, Tish-atal and Atal-shen. An inscription of the former is the oldest known text in Hurrian:

The sun god and the weather god in this inscription are most likely Hurrian Shimige and Teshub.

Atal-shen referred to Nergal as the lord of a location known as Hawalum:

Giorgio Buccellati in his translation quoted above renders the names of the other deities invoked as Shamash and Ishtar, but according to Alfonso Archi the logograms dUTU and dINANNA should be read as Shimige and Shaushka in this case.

The worship of Nergal is also well attested in the eastern Hurrian settlements. These include Arrapha, referred to as the "City of the Gods", which was located near modern Kirkuk, as well as Ḫilamani, Tilla and Ulamme, where an entu priestess dedicated to him resided. In the last three of these cities, he was associated with a goddess referred to as "dIŠTAR Ḫumella", the reading and meaning of whose name are unclear.

Myths

Nergal and Ereshkigal
Two versions of this myth are known, one from a single Middle Babylonian copy found in Amarna, seemingly copied by a scribe whose native language was not Akkadian and another known from Sultantepe and from Uruk, with copies dated to the neo-Assyrian and neo-Babylonian periods, respectively. The time of original composition is uncertain, with proposed dates varying from Old Babylonian to Middle Babylonian times. Whether a Sumerian original existed is unknown, and the surviving copies are all written in Akkadian.

After Nergal fails to pay respect to Ereshkigal's sukkal Namtar during a feast where he acts as a proxy of his mistress, who cannot leave the underworld to attend, she demands to have him sent to the underworld to answer for it. The El Amarna version states that she planned to kill Nergal, but this detail is absent from the other two copies.

Nergal descends to the underworld, but he's able to avoid many of its dangers thanks to advice given to him by Ea. However, he ignores one of them, and has sex with Ereshkigal. After six days he decides to leave while Ereshkigal is asleep. After noticing this she dispatches Namtar, and demands the other gods to convince Nergal to return again, threatening to open the gates of the underworld if she does not get what she asks for. Nergal is handed over to her again.

In the Amarna version, where Ereshkigal initially planned to kill Nergal, he defeats Namtar and prepares to kill Ereshkigal. To save herself, she suggests that they can get married and share the underworld. The other two known copies give the myth a happy ending: as noted by assyriologist Alhena Gadotti, "the two deities seem to reunite and live happily ever after", and the myth concludes with the line "they impetuously entered the bedchamber".

According to assyriologists such as Stephanie Dalley the purpose of this narrative was most likely to find a way to reconcile two different views of the underworld, one from the north centered on Nergal, and another from the south centered on Ereshkigal. Tikva Frymer-Kensky's attempt at interpreting it as evidence of "marginalization of goddesses" is regarded as erroneous. According to Alhena Gadotti the idea that Ereshkigal was supposed to share kingship over the underworld with her spouse is also known from the Old Babylonian composition Gilgamesh, Enkidu and the Underworld, in which Anu and Enlil give the underworld to her "as a dowry, her portion of the paternal estate's inheritance, which she controlled until she married". It is however impossible to tell which of the three gods regarded as Ereshkigal's husbands in various sources was implicitly meant to be the recipient of the dowry in this composition—Gugalanna, Nergal, or Ninazu.

Epic of Erra
The oldest surviving copies of the Epic of Erra come from the Assyrian city of Nineveh and have been dated to the seventh century BCE, but it has been argued that the composition is between 100 and 400 years older than that based on possible allusions to historical events which occurred during a period of calamity which Babylonia experienced roughly between eleventh and eighth centuries BCE. Based on a colophon, it was compiled by a certain Kabti-ilani-Marduk. Attribution of the text of a myth to a specific author was uncommon in ancient Mesopotamia.

Nergal (the names Nergal and Erra are both used to refer to the protagonist of the narrative) desires to wage war to counter a state of inertia he found himself in. His weapons (the Sebitti) urge him to take action, while his sukkal Ishum, who according to Andrew R. George appears to play the role of Nergal's conscience in this myth, attempts to stop him. Nergal dismisses the latter, noting that it is necessary to regain respect in the eyes of humans, and embarks on a campaign.
 
His first goal is Babylon. Through trickery he manages to convince Marduk (portrayed as a ruler past his prime, rather than as a dynamic hero) to leave his temple. However, Marduk returns too soon for Nergal to successfully start his campaign, and as a result in a long speech he promises to give other gods a reason to remember him. As a result of his declaration (or perhaps because of Marduk's temporary absence), the world seemingly finds itself in a state of cosmic chaos.

Ishum once again attempts to convince  Nergal to stop, but his pleading does not accomplish its goal. Nergal's acts keep escalating and soon Marduk is forced to leave his dwelling again, fully leaving the world at Nergal's mercy. A number of graphic descriptions of the horrors of war focused on nameless humans suffering because of Nergal's reign of terror follow. This is still not enough, and he declares his next goal is to destroy the remaining voices of moderation, and the cosmic order as a whole.

However, Ishum eventually manages to bring an end to the bloodshed. He does so by waging a war himself, targeting the inhabitants of Mount Sharshar, seemingly a site associated with the origin of the aforementioned  period of chaos in the history of late second and early first millennium BCE Babylonia. Ishum's war is described in very different terms to Nergal's, and with its end the period of instability comes to a close. Nergal is seemingly content with the actions of his sukkal and with hearing the other gods acknowledge the power of his rage. The narrative ends with Nergal instructing Ishum to spread the tale of his rampage, but also to make it clear that only thanks to his calming presence the world was spared.

Other myths
A poorly preserved Middle Assyrian composition, regarded as similar to the Labbu myth, seemingly describes a battle between Nergal (possibly acting on behalf of his father Enlil or the sky god Anu) and a monstrous serpent born in the sea.

The myth Enmesharra’s Defeat, only known from a single, heavily damaged copy from the Seleucid or Parthian period, casts Nergal as the warden of the eponymous antagonist and his seven sons, the Sebitti, presumably imprisoned in the underworld. In the surviving fragments Enmesharra unsuccessfully pleads with him to be released to avoid being put to death for his crimes at the orders of Marduk. In the aftermath of the ordeal, the universe is reorganized and Marduk shares lordship over it, which seemingly originally belonged to Anu in this composition, with Nergal and Nabu. Wilfred G. Lambert notes these gods were the 3 most prominent deities in the neo-Babylonian state pantheon. Curiously, Erra makes a brief appearance as a god distinct from Nergal, with his former sphere of influence reassigned to the latter.

Andrew R. George proposes that a myth presently unknown from textual records dealt with Nergal's combat with a one-eyed monster, the igitelû. He notes that Akkadian omen texts from Susa and from the Sealand archives appears to indicate that one-eyed creatures were known as igidalu, igidaru or igitelû, possibly a loanword from Sumerian igi.dili ("one eye"), and that the only god associated with them was Nergal, who in one such omen texts is identified as the slayer of an igitelû. There is also evidence that birth of one-eyed animals was regarded as an omen connected to Nergal. He proposes that a relief originally excavated in Khafajah (ancient Tubub) depicting a god stabbing a one-eyed monster with rays of light emenating from his head might be a pictorial representation of this hypothetical myth, though other interpretations have been proposed too, including Marduk killing Tiamat and Ninurta killing Asag. However, neither of these found widespread support, and art historian Anthony Green in particular showed skepticism regarding them, noting art might preserve myths not known from textual record. Wilfred G. Lambert suggested that the cyclops in mention might instead be a depiction of Enmesharra, based on his description as a luminous deity in Enmesharra's Defeat.

Later relevance
Nergal is mentioned in the Book of Kings as the deity of the city of Cuth (Kutha): "And the men of Babylon made Succoth-benoth, and the men of Cuth made Nergal" (2 Kings, 17:30).

In Mandaean cosmology, the name for Mars is Nirig. The name Nirig is derived from the name Nergal, which is a part of a recurrent pattern of Mandaean names of celestial bodies being derived from names of Mesopotamian deities.

Victorian lexicographer E. Cobham Brewer asserted that the name of Nergal, who he identified as "the most common idol of ancient Phoenicians, Indians and Persians", meant "dunghill cock". This translation is incorrect in the light of modern research, as Nergal's name most likely was understood as "Lord of the big city", his emblematic animals were bulls and lions, while chickens were unknown in Mesopotamia prior to the ninth century BCE based on archeological data, and left behind no trace in cuneiform sources.

References

Bibliography

External links
 
Compositions dedicated to Nergal in the Electronic Text Corpus of Sumerian Literature

Death gods
Deities in the Hebrew Bible
Hurrian deities
Martian deities
Mesopotamian gods
Mesopotamian underworld
Plague gods
Solar gods
Underworld gods
War gods
Lion deities